Erichsonius is a genus of beetles belonging to the family Staphylinidae.

The species of this genus are found in Europe and Northern America.

Species:
 Erichsonius aequiventris Tottenham, 1956
 Erichsonius affinis (Cameron, 1926)

References

Staphylinidae
Staphylinidae genera